The Hunfridings or Burchardings (Bouchardids) were a family of probably Alemannic origin who rose to prominence in their homeland, eventually becoming the first ducal dynasty of Swabia. The first known member of the family was Hunfrid, Margrave of Istria and, according to some sources, last Duke of Friuli under Charlemagne from 799. The last member of the clan was Burchard III, Duke of Swabia, who died in 973. Descendants of the dynasty lived on in the female line through the House of Wettin.

The most common and oft-recurring names in the family were Hunfrid, Adalbert, Odalric/Ulric, and Burchard. During the rise of the jüngeres Stammesherzogtum, that is, the "younger" stem duchies, the Hunfridings, like the Conradines in Franconia, were merely the most powerful among many well-entrenched ancient families vying for supremacy in Swabia. It took longer for them to establish their hereditary dukedom than either the Liudolfings in Saxony or the Liutpoldings in Bavaria.

When some Hunfridings, Odalric and Hunfrid III, rebelled against Louis the German in the 850s and fled to the court of Charles the Bald in West Francia, they were enfeoffed in Gothia and even given the title marchio, but though they successfully dealt with the Moorish threat from Iberia, they failed to establish a dynasty there.

The Hunfriding genealogy is difficult to trace with certainty. That the later Swabian dukes were descendants of the margrave of Istria and relatives to the host of other counts whose names were common in the family is difficult to prove with certainty, but is nonetheless very likely.

References
Reuter, Timothy. Germany in the Early Middle Ages 800–1056. New York: Longman, 1991.

 
German noble families
Noble families of the Holy Roman Empire